Esmailabad (also Romanized as Esmā‘īlābād; also known as Āb Deshkūn and Āb Āshḵān) is a village in Tus Rural District, in the Central District of Mashhad County, Razavi Khorasan Province, Iran. At the 2006 census, its population was 2,057, in 507 families.

References 

Populated places in Mashhad County